The Great Central Railway Class 8, known as the London and North Eastern Railway Class B5 following the 1923 Grouping, was a class of fourteen 4-6-0 steam locomotives designed to haul fast goods trains, in particular fish trains.

They were nicknamed "Fish Engines" because of their designed role and due to their frequent use on the fast fish trains heading from Grimsby to places like London. They were passed on into service with British Railways in 1948 and the last locomotive was withdrawn in 1950.

Models
A 1/5 scale, 10.25 in gauge model of number 181 has been made by Andrew Simkins. This model is externally faithful to Robinson's design, but also uses a footwell to conceal most of the driver in the tender. It was showcased and won an award at the Model engineering exhibition in 2003. It has since been seen on several of the 10.25 in gauge railways around Britain.

References

Bibliography

External links

 LNER Encyclopedia

4-6-0 locomotives
2′C n2 locomotives
08
Neilson locomotives
Beyer, Peacock locomotives
Railway locomotives introduced in 1902
Scrapped locomotives
Standard gauge steam locomotives of Great Britain
2′C h2 locomotives
 Great Central Railway 4-6-0s

Freight locomotives